Super Series '76-77 was an ice hockey tournament, which saw the team from HC CSKA Moscow, also called the "Red Army" in English (as all players were superficially members of the Soviet Army), touring North America to play against teams from the World Hockey Association (WHA). The tournament was played from December 27, 1976 to January 8, 1977, in the middle of the regular schedules of the WHA and Soviet league.

Results

See also 
HC CSKA Moscow
Super Series '76
Super Series

References 

1976
1976–77 WHA season
1976–77 in Soviet ice hockey
HC CSKA Moscow